William Whiting may refer to:

William Whiting (poet) (1825–1878), English writer and hymnist
William Whiting (Massachusetts politician) (1813–1873), member of the U.S. House of Representatives from Massachusetts
William Whiting II (1841–1911), member of the U.S. House of Representatives from Massachusetts
His son, William F. Whiting (1864–1936), U.S. Secretary of Commerce
William H.C. Whiting (1824–1865), U.S. Army officer
William Austin Whiting (1855–1908), American lawyer and politician of Hawaii
William B Whiting, Colonel, 17th Albany Militia Regiment, Albany, New York (American Revolutionary era)
 William Whiting (1660–1724), Colonel of a provincial regiment from Connecticut during the Siege of Port Royal (1710).